Land of Giants is an album by McCoy Tyner released on the Telarc label in 2003. It was recorded in December 2002 and features performances of Tyner with vibraphonist Bobby Hutcherson, bassist Charnett Moffett and drummer Eric Harland. The Allmusic review by Matt Collar states that "While the work here is by no means as provocative as the stuff Hutcherson and Tyner produced in their heydays, it nonetheless proves them to be utter masters of the straight-ahead modern jazz idiom and should appeal to longtime fans".

Track listing
 "Serra Do Mar" - 6:34
 "December" - 4:47
 "Steppin'" - 4:48
 "If I Were a Bell" (Loesser) - 7:50
 "Manalyuca" - 7:20
 "Back Bay Blues" - 6:11
 "For All We Know" (Coots, Lewis) - 4:33
 "The Search" - 5:47
 "Contemplation" - 6:13
 "In a Mellow Tone" (Ellington, Gabler) - 6:17

All compositions by McCoy Tyner except as indicated

Personnel
McCoy Tyner - piano
Bobby Hutcherson - vibes
Charnett Moffett - bass
Eric Harland - drums

References

McCoy Tyner albums
2003 albums
Telarc Records albums